The Bagdis are indigenous people descended from people with Dravidian links found in the Indian state of West Bengal and Bangladesh who were associated with professions like cultivating and fishing. The Bagdis are populous in Bankura, Birbhum and other districts in the western fringe of West Bengal. The Bagdis are one of the most numerous Scheduled castes of West Bengal.

History 
J.N Bhattacharya described the Bagdis as an aboriginal tribe, who were fishermen, woodcutters, and litter carriers. The bagdis were also known as the criminal tribe of Bengal under Criminal Tribes Act of the British.

Population and Literacy Data 
The Bagdis numbered 2,740,385 in West Bengal in the 2001 Indian census and were 14.9 percent of the scheduled caste population of West Bengal.  47.7 percent of the Bagdis were literate –  60.4 percent males and 34.8 percent females were literate.

See also
 Bagdi Raja

References

Bengali Hindu castes
Ethnic groups in Bangladesh
Ethnic groups in India
Scheduled Tribes of India
Social groups of West Bengal